Provincial road N711 (N711) is a road connecting Rijksweg 6 (A6) near Swifterbant with N307 in Dronten.

External links

711
711